The Ferguson Nunataks are a nunatak group lying between the heads of Meinardus Glacier and Swann Glacier in Palmer Land, Antarctica. They were mapped by the United States Geological Survey from ground surveys and U.S. Navy air photos, 1961–67, and were named by the Advisory Committee on Antarctic Names for Charles L. Ferguson, an electrician with the Palmer Station winter party in 1965.

References 

Nunataks of Palmer Land